The Bedsitting Room is a satirical play by Spike Milligan and John Antrobus. It began as a one-act play which was first produced on 12 February 1962 at the Marlowe Theatre in Canterbury, England. The Bedsitting Room was then adapted to a longer play and Bernard Miles put it on at the Mermaid Theatre, where it was first performed on 31 January 1963 before transferring several weeks later to the Duke of York's Theatre in London's West End.

The production included a coup de théâtre, when the character "Mate" (originally played in London by Spike Milligan) entered wearing a mixture of ragged military uniforms from across the centuries. Attached to his boots were long strips of canvas to which were attached pairs of boots. As he marched across the stage, the empty boots marched in time behind him. The play was considered a critical and commercial hit, and was revived in 1967 with a provincial tour, before opening at London's Saville Theatre on 3 May 1967. The script was later published in paperback book.

The play was presented in repertory by the Theatre Royal, York in 1972, and was also shown by Bench Theatre in Havant for seven nights in July 1981.

The play is set in a post-apocalyptic London, nine months after World War III (the "Nuclear Misunderstanding"), which lasted for two minutes and twenty-eight seconds – "including the signing of the peace treaty". Nuclear fallout is producing strange mutations in people; the title refers to the character Lord Fortnum, who finds himself transforming into a bed-sitting room (other characters turn into a parrot and a wardrobe). The plot concerns the fate of the first child to be born after the war.

A film based on the play was released in 1969. The film was directed by Richard Lester and the cast included Ralph Richardson, Arthur Lowe, Rita Tushingham, Peter Cook, Dudley Moore, Michael Hordern, Marty Feldman, Harry Secombe and Milligan himself.

Authors' intentions 

In his 2002 book of reflections, Antrobus describes his idea as about "a man who fears he will turn into a bedsitting room, which he does, and the dubious doctor he has been seeing moves in with his fiancée, declaring that it will be easier to work a cure on the premises. Therein lies the dilemma. For the doctor to heal the condition would mean becoming homeless".

In a 1988 interview with Bernard Braden on ITV's All Our Yesterdays, Milligan portrayed his view of The Bedsitting Room thus:

Original cast list for play 

The following is the original cast list as it appears on page 5 of the 1973 paperback of the script, with music played by The Temperance Seven

Captain Pontius Kak, Graham Stark. This is Lord Fortnum's doctor, whose name appears to have later changed to Captain Martin. At one time Barry Humphries played this role, which he names as Captain Martin Bules.
Lord Fortnum of Alamein, Valentine Dyall
Mate/Arthur Scroake, Spike Milligan
Shelter Man, John Bluthal
Plastic Mac Man, John Bluthal
Underwater Vicar, John Bluthal
Brigadier/Sergeant, John Bluthal
Chest of Drawers/Gladys Scroake, Marjie Lawrence
Penelope, Marjie Lawrence

Diplomat, Bob Todd
First Announcer, Bob Todd
Sea Captain, Bob Todd
Second Announcer, Johnny Vyvyan
Delivery Man/Chauffeur, Johnny Vyvyan
Seaman, Johnny Vyvyan
Coffin Man, Clive Elliott
Pianist, Alan Chase
Third Announcer, Bill Kerr
Extras:
Phantom
Old Soldier
Orderly

Literary and dramatic counterparts 

The Bedsitting Room can be compared with The Goon Show, in which Milligan and Secombe were involved, but with a savage, cynical and even more surreal edge, and an existential despair; one criticdescribed it as being "like Samuel Beckett, but with better jokes".

Radio adaptation 
A radio adaptation was broadcast on BBC Radio 4 on 26 December 2015 featuring Paul Merton, Derek Jacobi, Bernard Cribbins and Catherine Tate.

See also
The Bed Sitting Room (film)

References

External links 

 The Bedsitting Room at Bench Theatre

1962 plays
Post-apocalyptic literature
Surreal comedy
Satirical plays
Surrealist plays
Works by Spike Milligan
Plays adapted into radio programs
British plays adapted into films
Plays set in London
Fiction about nuclear war and weapons